Sam Simmons (born 19 March 1977) is an Australian comedian and radio and TV presenter.

Career
Simmons has appeared on Conan, 8 Out of 10 Cats, Room 101, Adam DeVine's House Party and is currently developing his own sitcom in the UK. Network appearances include NBC, BBC, Channel 4, ABC, and all other Australian networks.

Previously, he was a regular host on Triple J as well as jtv interviewing bands, he developed his style of non-sequitur and surrealist non-humour. This led to his first television show, The Urban Monkey with Murray Foote, in 2009.

In 2012, Simmons followed up with a sketch-style TV series Problems, with a tone more similar to that of his surrealist stand-up shows. He performed at TEDxSydney in 2014 and is now on a new a US pilot filmed in Albuquerque with David Quirk.  Simmons described it as "a reality show about animals". Simmons regularly appears on the comedy quiz show Dirty Laundry Live.

In 2015, he won the Edinburgh Fringe Comedy award having been nominated three times previously, and the 2015 Barry Award at the Melbourne International Comedy Festival. In 2017, he provided the voice of Mr Wallaby in Peppa Pig.

In 2019, Simmons performed a new show "26 Things You're Doing Wrong with Sam Simmons" about unconventional life hacks. in 2020 he appeared in the Australian comedy series LOL: Last one Laughing.

Awards and nominations

Awards
2003 Participation Award for The Steve Promise Story
2003 Moosehead Award for The Steve Promise Story
2006 Adelaide Fringe Festival Best Emerging Comedy Award for Tales from the Erotic Cat
2006 The Groggy Squirrel Critics' Award for Tales from the Erotic Cat
2008 MICF Directors' Choice Award for Where can I win a bear around here?
2010 MICF Golden Gibbo Award for The Incident with David Quirk
2010 MICF Piece of Wood Award for Fail
2011 Adelaide Fringe Festival Best Comedy Award for Sam Simmons and the Precise History of Things
2014 Sydney Comedy Festival Director's Choice Award for Death of a Sails-Man
2015 MICF Barry Award for Spaghetti for Breakfast
2015 Fosters Edinburgh Comedy award, best show for Spaghetti for Breakfast

Nominations
2003 Triple J Raw Comedy Competition (finalist)
2006 MICF Barry Award for Tales from the Erotic Cat
2011 MICF Barry Award for Precise History of Things (Meanwhile -UK)
2011 Edinburgh Best Comedy Award for Meanwhile
2014 Edinburgh Best Comedy Award for Death of a Sails-man
2015 MICF Barry Award for Spaghetti for Breakfast
2015 Edinburgh Best Comedy Award for Spaghetti for Breakfast

References

External links

 Triple J Sam Simmons page

 The Groggy Squirrel's Sam Simmons page
 MICF Sam Simmons page

Living people
People from Adelaide
Triple J announcers
1977 births
Australian stand-up comedians
Helpmann Award winners